Field hockey at the 2011 Pan American Games in Guadalajara was held over an eleven-day period beginning on October 19 and culminating with the medal finals on October 28 and October 29. All games were played at the Pan American Hockey Stadium. Each team was allowed to enter a maximum of sixteen athletes. The winner of each tournament qualified to compete at the 2012 Summer Olympics in London, Great Britain.

Canada, Trinidad and Tobago and Barbados were drawn into the same group for both tournaments, as well as Cuba, Mexico and the United States. Only Argentina and Chile swapped groups.

Medal summary

Medal table

Events

Competition format
Eight teams competed in both the men's and women's Pan American Games hockey tournaments with the competition consisting of two rounds.
In the first round, teams were divided into two pools of four teams, and play followed round robin format with each of the teams playing all other teams in the pool once.  Teams were awarded three points for a win, one point for a draw and zero points for a loss.

Following the completion of the pool games, teams placing first and second in each pool advanced to a single elimination round consisting of two semifinal games, and the bronze and gold medal games. Remaining teams competed in classification matches to determine their ranking in the tournament. During these matches, extra time of 7½ minutes per half was played if teams were tied at the end of regulation time. During extra time, play followed golden goal rules with the first team to score declared the winner. If no goals were scored during extra time, a penalty stroke competition took place.

Men

Participating nations

Pools were based on the current world rankings (January 4, 2011). Teams ranked 1, 4, 5 and 8 would be in Pool A, while teams ranked 2, 3, 6 and 7 would be in Pool B.

Pool A

Pool B

Women

Participating nations

Pools were based on the current world rankings (January 4, 2011). Teams ranked 1, 4, 5 and 8 would be in Pool A, while teams ranked 2, 3, 6 and 7 would be in Pool B.

Pool A

Pool B

Schedule
The competition will be spread out across ten days, with the men and women competing on alternating dates.

References

 
Events at the 2011 Pan American Games
Pan American Games
2011
2011 Pan American Games